Araucaria hunsteinii (Klinki , Klinkii or "Klinky", native names Rassu and Pai) is a species of Araucaria native to the mountains of Papua New Guinea. It is threatened by habitat loss.

The branches are horizontal, produced in whorls of five or six.

Cultivation and uses
It is a fast-growing tree, and is being tested as a potentially important timber crop in tropical highland climates.

Pests
Barinae spp., Setomorpha rutella, Microlepidopteras, Cacatua galerita (the Sulphur-crested cockatoo) are pests of pine nut production in A. hunsteinii. C. galerita may cause half of the seed crop to be lost in a year, mostly by trying to eat cones that are not yet ready. However, another source describes A. hunsteinii as suffering few pests in plantations, and therefore substituting A. cunninghamii in plantations that suffer more from pests.

References

Howcroft, N. H. S. (1978). Data sheets on species undergoing genetic impoverishment: Araucaria hunsteinii. Forest Genetics Resources Information 8: 31-37.
Russo, R. O., & Briscoe, C. B. (2002). Performance of Klinki (Araucaria hunsteinii K. Schuman) in the Humid Tropics of Costa Rica. Journal of Sustainable Forestry 14 (4): 13-18.

hunsteinii
Flora of New Guinea
Flora of Papua New Guinea
Near threatened plants
Taxonomy articles created by Polbot